Nell Hopman and Harry Hopman recorded their fourth and last mixed doubles victory by defeating the defending champions Margaret Wilson and John Bromwich 6–8, 6–2, 6–3, to win the mixed doubles tennis title at the 1939 Australian Championships.

Seeds

  Margaret Wilson /  John Bromwich (final)
  Nell Hopman /  Harry Hopman (champions)
  Thelma Coyne /  Len Schwartz (first round)
  Nancye Wynne /  Colin Long (semifinals)

Draw

References

External links
  Source for seedings
  Source for the draw

1939 in Australian tennis
Mixed Doubles